Ronald John Steiner (April 30, 1938 – July 31, 2015) was an American football and baseball coach. He served as the head football coach at University of Wisconsin–Stevens Point from 1977 to 1981, compiling a record of 26–24–1. Steiner was also the head baseball coach at Wisconsin–Stevens Point in 1976 and again from 1983 to 1986, tallying a mark of 57–75.

Steiner played college football at the University of Wisconsin at Madison.

Head coaching record

College football

References

External links
 

1938 births
2015 deaths
American football running backs
American men's basketball players
Wisconsin Badgers football players
Wisconsin Badgers men's basketball players
Wisconsin–Stevens Point Pointers baseball coaches
Wisconsin–Stevens Point Pointers football coaches
High school football coaches in Michigan
High school football coaches in Wisconsin
High school wrestling coaches in the United States
People from Iron Mountain, Michigan
Players of American football from Michigan